1 Mile North is an ambient / post-rock duo, consisting of guitarist Jon Hills and keyboardist Mark Bajuk.

Albums
The band has released four full-length albums, a split LP with Colophon and The Wind-Up Bird, and a collection of home and live recordings. 

Their fourth album "Tombs and Cocoons" was released on February 20, 2020.

Use of Music
The band's music has been featured in Steven Okazaki's Oscar Nominated documentary The Conscience of Nhem En, as well as Okazaki's White Light/Black Rain: The Destruction of Hiroshima and Nagasaki.

Music was also featured within the score of 2013's Facing Fear, a documentary from Jason Cohen nominated for an Oscar in 2014.

Discography
Albums
Glass Wars (Old Colony, 2001)
Minor Shadows (Ba Da Bing!, 2003)
Awakened by Decay (Wortcunner, 2016)
Tombs & Cocoons (Wortcunner, 2020)

Split albums
Convection. Conduction. Radiation. (Music Fellowship, 2004) (with Colophon & The Wind-Up Bird)

Live albums
Altare Della Patria: Home and Concert Recordings 2000-2003 (Old Colony, 2004)

References

External links

 
 
 1 Mile North at Ba Da Bing! Records

Electronic music groups from New York (state)
American post-rock groups